Tuğba Karataş (March 17, 1992) is a Turkish women's football midfielder, who plays in the Turkish Women's Super League for Ankara BB Fomget GS with jersey number 23. She was part of the Turkey women's national U-17, U-19 and A teams.

Club career 

Tuğba Karataş obtained her license on May 31, 2004, for Gazi Üniversitesispor, where she played until the end of the 2011–12 season. She enjoyed league champion titles in the 2007–08 and 2009–10 seasons. She capped 66 times in total and scored 25 goals for Gazi Üniversitesispor. Karataş took part at the 2010–11 UEFA Women's Champions League qualifying round- – Group 1 matches with Gazi Üniversitesispor. In the 2012–13 season, she played for Kdz. Ereğlispor, where she appeared in 18 games. After one season, Karataş transferred to Trabzon İdmanocağı.

In the 2020–21 Turkish Women's League season, she played for the Ankara-based club Fomhet Gençlik ve Spor.

She transferred to Fatih Vatan Spor in Istanbul for the 2021–22 Turkish Women's Super League.

International career 
Tuğba Karataş was admitted to the Turkey gitls' national U-17 team and debuted in the friendly match against Azerbaijan on May 27, 2007. She took part at the 2008 UEFA Championship qualifying round – Group 6 and 2009 UEFA Championship qualifying round – Group 5 matches. She capped in 11 games.

On April 15, 2009, she played for the first time in the Turkey women's U-19 team at the friendly match against Belarus. Karataş played at the 2010 UEFA  Championship First qualifying round – Group 7 matches. She was in 6 matches of the Turkey women's U-19 team.

She was called up to the Turkey women's national team to play at the UEFA Euro 2013 qualifying – Group 2 matches; however, she sat on the bench. On 7 April 2022, she debuted for the Turkey national team in the 2023 FIFA Women's World Cup qualification match against Bulgaria.

Career statistics

Honours 
 Turkey Women's First Football League
 Gazi Üniversitesispor
 Winners (2): 2007–08, 2009–10
 Third places (1): 2008–09

 Kdz. Ereğlispor
 Third places (1): 2012–13

 Trabzon İdmanocağı
 Third places (1): 2014–15

References

External links 

1992 births
Living people
People from Delice
Turkish women's footballers
Turkey women's international footballers
Women's association football midfielders
Women's association football forwards
Gazi Üniversitesispor players
Karadeniz Ereğlispor players
Trabzon İdmanocağı women's players
Fomget Gençlik ve Spor players
Turkish Women's Football Super League players
Fatih Vatan Spor players